Daniele Tacconi (born 18 November 1960 in Pelago) is a retired Italian professional football player.

Tacconi began his career with Perugia Calcio in the 1970s and 1980s.

He played for three seasons (56 games, one goal) in the Serie A for Perugia Calcio and A.C. Milan.

He represented Italy at the 1980 UEFA European Under-21 Football Championship.

References

1960 births
Living people
Italian footballers
Italy under-21 international footballers
Serie A players
A.C. Perugia Calcio players
Delfino Pescara 1936 players
A.C. Milan players
A.C. Monza players
A.C. Reggiana 1919 players
U.S. Catanzaro 1929 players
Association football midfielders